The Cabinet of Zambia consists of the President, Vice-President, twenty-five Ministers, and the Attorney General. It formulates the government's policies and advises the President.

Current Cabinet
The first cabinet meeting was held on Friday 17 September 2021

See also 
 Politics of Zambia
 National Assembly of Zambia

References

External links
 Cabinet Ministers, Zambian State House.

Zambia
Politics of Zambia